The 17th SAARC summit was held on November 10, 2011, in the South Province of Maldives (Addu Atoll, Fuvahmulah). The theme of the summit was “Building Bridges”.

Participants

See also
 List of SAARC summits
 18th SAARC summit

References

External links
  

2011 in international relations
21st-century diplomatic conferences (Africa)
South Asian Association for Regional Cooperation Summits
2011 conferences
2011 in the Maldives
Diplomatic conferences in the Maldives